The 2019–20 ASUN Conference men's basketball season began with practices in October 2019, followed by the start of the 2019–20 NCAA Division I men's basketball season in November. Conference play begins in January 2020 and concluded in March 2020. It was the 42nd season of ASUN Conference basketball.

Preseason 
On October 11, 2019, the conference announced its preseason honors and polls.

Preseason men's basketball coaches poll
(First place votes in parenthesis)
 Liberty (7) 79
 North Florida (2) 74
 FGCU 60
 NJIT 51
 Lipscomb 40
 North Alabama 35
 Jacksonville 32
 Kennesaw State 20
 Stetson 14

Preseason men's basketball media poll
(First place votes in parenthesis)
 Liberty (44) 429
 North Florida (2) 340
 FGCU 314
 Lipscomb (2) 298
 NJIT 240
 North Alabama 189
 Jacksonville 161
 Kennesaw State 99
 Stetson 90

Honors
Preseason Player of the Year: Caleb Homesley, Liberty
Preseason Defensive Player of the Year: Wajid Aminu, North Florida
Fan-Voted Preseason Player of the Year: Christiaan Jones, Stetson
Fan-Voted Preseason Defensive Player of the Year: Jahlil Rawley, Stetson

Conference matrix

All-Atlantic Sun awards

Atlantic Sun men's basketball weekly awards

Conference awards 
On March 3, 2020, the ASUN announced its conference awards.

References